Elaeocarpus costatus  is a species of flowering plant in the family Elaeocarpaceae that is endemic to Lord Howe Island. It is a tree with lance-shaped to elliptic leaves with wavy-toothed edges, flowers in groups of eight to ten, and blue fruit.

Description
The edges of the leaves have wavy teeth, but the teeth are pointed when young. The leaves turn bright red before falling.

Taxonomy
Elaeocarpus costatus was first formally described in 1939 by Mary Ruth Fussel Jackson Taylor in the Bulletin of Miscellaneous Information, Royal Gardens, Kew from specimens collected by James Doran McComish (1881–1948). The specific epithet (costatus) means "ribbed", referring to the ribs on the endocarp of the fruit.

The species was illustrated in 1902 by Joseph Maiden in the Proceedings of the Linnean Society of New South Wales with a diagram of a leaf and fruit.

Distribution and habitat
This species is endemic to Lord Howe Island, where it is rare. It is found on the southern end of the island, usually in the mountains, including in cloud forest, but occasionally also in the lowlands.

See also
 List of Elaeocarpus species

References

costatus
Endemic flora of Lord Howe Island
Plants described in 1939
Oxalidales of Australia